Bullet Space is a legalized squat, artists’ collective and art gallery on the Lower East Side of New York City, founded in 1986 by Andrew and Paul Castrucci, among others. In 2009, it was legalized by the city.

History
The building at 292 East Third Street on the Lower East Side in Manhattan was squatted in 1986. Featuring living spaces as well as a gallery and exhibition space, Bullet Space shows politically oriented street art. It became an art gallery. The collective's Your House Is Mine artists’ book, from 1992, collects thirty-three signed silkscreen prints made in the aftermath of the 1988 Tompkins Square Park riot, with artwork from David Wojnarowicz, Martin Wong, Sandra “Lady Pink” Fabara, and Lee Quiñones, writing from Miguel Algarín, Chris Burden, Martha Cooper, Allen Ginsberg, Cookie Mueller, Public Enemy, and Andres Serrano, and has been acquired by the Metropolitan Museum of Art, the Museum of Modern Art, the Whitney Museum of American Art, the Getty, and the Walker Arts Center, among others. In 2009, it was the first of the East Village squats to become legalized by the city.

Artists

The gallery has housed or exhibited artists including:
 Lizzi Bougatsos
 John Farris
 Leo Fitzpatrick
 David Hammons
 Richard Kern
 Chris Molnar
 Raymond Pettibon
 Melvin Way
 David Wojnarowicz

References

External links
Bullet Space Website
Howl Arts presents Andrew Castrucci: 36 Years at Bullet Space

Contemporary art galleries in the United States
1985 establishments in New York City
Art museums and galleries in Manhattan
Art galleries established in 1985
Lower East Side
Legalized squats
Squats in the United States
Alphabet City, Manhattan
East Village, Manhattan